Cervelló is a municipality of the Baix Llobregat in Catalonia, Spain. It is located at the foot of Serra d'Ordal.

References

External links
 Official Web City Council
 Government data pages 

Municipalities in Baix Llobregat